The Leonard–Merritt mass estimator is a formula for estimating the mass of a spherical stellar system using the apparent (angular) positions and proper motions of its component stars. The distance to the stellar system must also be known.

Like the virial theorem, the Leonard–Merritt estimator yields correct results regardless of the degree of velocity anisotropy. Its statistical properties are superior to those of the virial theorem. However, it requires that two components of the velocity be known for every star, rather than just one for the virial theorem.

The estimator has the general form

Like all estimators based on moments of the Jeans equations, the Leonard–Merritt estimator requires an assumption about the relative distribution of mass and light. As a result, it is most useful when applied to stellar systems that have one of two properties:
 All or almost all of the mass resides in a central object, or,
 the mass is distributed in the same way as the observed stars.
Case (1) applies to the nucleus of a galaxy containing a supermassive black hole. Case (2) applies to a stellar system composed entirely of luminous stars (i.e. no dark matter or black holes).

In a cluster with constant mass-to-light ratio and total mass , the Leonard–Merritt estimator becomes:

On the other hand, if all the mass is located in a central point of mass , then:

In its second form, the Leonard–Merritt estimator has been successfully used to measure the mass of the supermassive black hole at the center of the Milky Way galaxy.

See also
 Globular cluster
 Proper motion
 Virial theorem

References

Astrometry
Celestial mechanics
Stellar astronomy
Supermassive black holes